Henryk Bartyla (born 17 June 1925, died in February 2001) was a Polish footballer. He played in seven matches for the Poland national football team from 1952 to 1955.

References

External links
 

1925 births
Polish footballers
Poland international footballers
Sportspeople from Zabrze
Association football midfielders
Ruch Chorzów players
2001 deaths